Sterling Moore (born February 3, 1990) is a former American football cornerback and coach who is a defensive assistant for the New Orleans Saints of the National Football League (NFL). He played college football at Southern Methodist University.

Early years
Moore attended Deer Valley High School, where he played as a wide receiver and defensive back. He also practiced basketball.

He moved on to Laney College, where he became a starter at cornerback, appearing in 10 games as a freshman, while making 30 tackles, five interceptions, 9 passes defensed and one forced fumble. The next year, he received All-JUCO honors.

After his sophomore season, he transferred to Southern Methodist University. He finished his college career after appearing in 19 games, while posting 59 tackles, 2 interceptions, 18 passes defensed, 2 sacks and one fumble recovery.

Professional career

Oakland Raiders
On July 28, 2011, he was signed by the Oakland Raiders as an undrafted free agent. He was waived on September 3 and re-signed the next day to the practice squad. He was released on September 26.

New England Patriots
On October 5, 2011, he was signed by the New England Patriots to their practice squad. On October 15, he was signed to the active roster and made his NFL debut against the New York Jets on November 13, starting every snap at safety for the Patriots.

On December 10, 2011, Moore was released by New England. On December 14, 2011, he was re-signed to the Patriots practice squad and on December 23, 2011, he was promoted to the active roster. On January 1, 2012, in Week 17 of the 2011-12 NFL season, Moore recorded two interceptions against the Buffalo Bills, returning one for a touchdown. Late in the AFC Championship against the Baltimore Ravens, as the Ravens were driving toward a potential game clinching touchdown, Moore struck Lee Evans' arm on a pass to the end zone, almost certainly preventing a touchdown that could have sent the Ravens to Super Bowl XLVI.  After the incomplete pass, Billy Cundiff missed a game-tying field goal as the Patriots went on to win 23–20, earning for Moore an AFC Championship ring.

On October 31, 2012, he was waived and re-signed to the Patriots practice squad two days later.

Dallas Cowboys
On November 30, 2012, he was signed by the Dallas Cowboys from the New England Patriots practice squad to replace an injured Orlando Scandrick. He played in the last five games of the season mostly in passing situations.

Moore was released on August 31, 2013, in favor of rookie fourth round draft choice B. W. Webb. The team brought him back on November 25, to play as the fourth corner in passing situations.

In 2014, after being mostly relegated to a reserve role during his career, he was named the team's nickel back during Orlando Scandrick's suspension and kept the role after Morris Claiborne suffered a season ending knee injury. He played in 16 games (7 starts), registered 49 tackles and led all Cowboys defensive backs with 14 passes defensed.

Tampa Bay Buccaneers
On March 19, 2015, Moore signed with the Tampa Bay Buccaneers. He was used as the nickel cornerback in the first four games of the season, before being passed on the depth chart by Alterraun Verner and moved to a backup role.

He was named the starting left cornerback in the seventh game of the season and had eight starts, before coming from the bench in the season finale. He registered 45 tackles, one interception, 6 passes defended, and 3 forced fumbles.

Buffalo Bills
Moore signed with the Buffalo Bills on April 5, 2016. On September 2, he was released as part of final roster cuts.

New Orleans Saints
On September 6, 2016, Moore was signed by the New Orleans Saints to replace the recently released Cortland Finnegan. He played in 13 games with 12 starts for the Saints, recording career-highs with 56 tackles, 13 passes defensed along with two interceptions.

On March 23, 2017, Moore re-signed with the Saints.

With the emergence of their younger cornerbacks, the Saints released Moore on October 25, 2017. He was re-signed on November 20, 2017. He was released again on December 14, 2017. He was re-signed on December 21, 2017.

Detroit Lions
On August 20, 2018, Moore signed with the Detroit Lions. He was released on August 31, 2018.

Arizona Hotshots (AAF)
Moore was signed by the Arizona Hotshots of the Alliance of American Football on January 17, 2019. The league ceased operations in April 2019.

In October 2019, Moore was selected by the Seattle Dragons in the 10th round during phase 4 of the 2020 XFL Draft.

Coaching career

New Orleans Saints
In March of 2022, Moore joined the New Orleans Saints coaching staff as a defensive assistant.

References

External links
SMU Mustangs bio
Tampa Bay Buccaneers bio

1990 births
Living people
American football cornerbacks
American football safeties
Arizona Hotshots players
Buffalo Bills players
Dallas Cowboys players
Detroit Lions players
Laney Eagles football players
New England Patriots players
New Orleans Saints players
Oakland Raiders players
People from Antioch, California
Players of American football from California
SMU Mustangs football players
Sportspeople from the San Francisco Bay Area
Tampa Bay Buccaneers players
New Orleans Saints coaches